Washington County is a former county of South Dakota, existing from 1883 to 1943. On July 1, 1943, it was divided and then merged into Jackson County, Pennington County, and Shannon County in 1943 because of financial troubles in South Dakota. For several years prior to its dissolution, Washington County was unorganized and was administered by Pennington County. Part of Washington County had previously been partitioned into the newly created Bennett County in 1909.

References

Former counties of South Dakota
Former populated places in South Dakota
1880s establishments in South Dakota
1943 disestablishments in South Dakota
Oglala Lakota County, South Dakota
Pennington County, South Dakota
Jackson County, South Dakota